Constantino Reyes-Valerio (10 January 1922 - 13 December 2006) was a  prominent Mexican scholar
of pre-Columbian Mesoamerican cultures, particularly the Aztec and the Maya as well as the Colonial Art.

Reyes-Valerio identified the artistic contribution of Native Mexican Indians in the Colonial painting and sculpture; he coined the term
Indochristian art. Another major contribution was his seminal work on the chemical composition and process of the Maya Blue Pigment
where he re-discovered the technique used by the Maya to create the famous turquoise blue pigment. He was granted a Guggenheim Fellowship in 1972 for Fine Arts Research. He corresponded extensively with major scholars in Mexico and abroad such as George Kubler, Santiago Sebastian and Enrique Marco Dorta among others. In 2000 he was named Emeritus Researcher by the Instituto Nacional de Antropología e Historia.

In April 2009, a special edition of the INAH bulletin (Boletin de Monumentos Historicos Num 12 enero-abril 2008) was published as an in memoriam edition dedicated to Constantino Reyes-Valerio. Several important researchers, Miguel Leon-Portilla, Alfredo López Austin, Eduardo Matos Moctezuma, Giacomo Chiari, Carlos Navarrete Cáceres, Beatriz Barba Ahuatzin, Dora Sierra, Guillermo Tovar y de Teresa, Manuel Sanchez del Rio, Rosa Camelo among others contributed with articles to this bulletin.

He was a very active photographer and took the photographs for several books and to the general archive of the INAH. In 2009, his contribution was recognised by naming the Photographic Archive of the "Coordinacion Nacional de Monumentos Culturales" of INAH with his name.

He received several awards, including the Guggenheim Fellowship, the Rafael Ramirez Prize granted by the S.E.P., Premio Francisco Javier Clavijero granted by INAH and the Emeritus Researcher degree by INAH as well.

Related links

Maya Blue
Indochristian art

External links

Maya Blue Pigment site developed by Reyes-Valerio
Arte Indocristiano site developed by Reyes-Valerio
INAH webpage with detail of the Fototeca (english)

Mexican art historians
Mexican Mesoamericanists
20th-century Mesoamericanists
Historians of Mesoamerican art
1922 births
2006 deaths